Hexaplex bifasciatus is a species of sea snail, a marine gastropod mollusk in the family Muricidae, the murex snails or rock snails. It is included in the subgenus Trunculariopsis.

Description

Distribution

References

Hexaplex
Gastropods described in 1853